Elias Kapavore (born 25 May 1970) is a Papua New Guinean politician. He has been a member of the National Parliament of Papua New Guinea since May 2015, representing the electorate of Pomio Open in East New Britain Province.

Kapavore, from Paka village in the West Pomio/Mamusi area, was educated at Pokapun Primary School, Palmalud High School and Divine Word University, receiving a management degree and a double masters in public and business administration. He was the chief executive officer of the Vanimo Hospital and the West Sepik Provincial Health Authority prior to entering politics.

Nominating as an independent, Kapavore won a May 2015 by-election for the Pomio Open seat following the conviction and imprisonment of the seat's former MP, Paul Tiensten. He joined the governing People's National Congress upon his election, and declared his priority as being to "deliver roads and bridges which will connect Pomio to Kokopo". In November 2015, he raised concerns about environmental damage caused by Niugini Gold Limited's Sinivit Mine.

References

1970 births
Living people
Members of the National Parliament of Papua New Guinea
People's National Congress (Papua New Guinea) politicians
Divine Word University alumni